Hileithia ductalis is a moth in the family Crambidae. It was described by Heinrich Benno Möschler in 1890. It is found in Puerto Rico and Cuba.

The larvae feed on Blechum pyramidatum.

References

Moths described in 1890
Spilomelinae